Late capitalism, late-stage capitalism, or end-stage capitalism is a term first used in print by German economist Werner Sombart around the turn of the 20th century. In the late 2010s, the term began to be used in the United States and Canada to refer to perceived absurdities, contradictions, crises, injustices, inequality, and exploitation created by modern business development.

Later capitalism refers to the historical epoch since 1940, including the post–World War II economic expansion called the "golden age of capitalism". The expression already existed for a long time in continental Europe, before it gained popularity in the English-speaking world through the English translation of Ernest Mandel's book Late Capitalism, published in 1975.

The German original edition of Mandel's work was subtitled in "an attempt at an explanation", meaning that Mandel tried to provide an orthodox Marxist explanation of the post-war epoch in terms of Marx's theory of the capitalist mode of production.   Mandel suggested   that important qualitative changes occurred within the capitalist system during and after World War II and that there are limits to capitalist development.

History of the term
The term "late capitalism" (Spätkapitalismus) was first used by Werner Sombart in his magnum opus Der Moderne Kapitalismus, which was published from 1902 through 1927, and subsequent writings; Sombart divided capitalism into different stages: (1) proto-capitalist society from the early middle ages up to 1500 AD, (2) early capitalism in 1500–1800, (3) the heyday of capitalism (Hochkapitalismus) from 1800 to the first World War, and (4) late capitalism since then. Sombart's work was never translated into English, but historians sometimes do refer to late bourgeois society in contrast to early bourgeois society in the 17th and 18th century, or classical bourgeois society in the 19th and early 20th century.

Vladimir Lenin famously declared that there are no "absolutely hopeless situations" for capitalism. The Communist International stated that with the first World War, a new world epoch of wars and revolutions had opened, and it defined state monopoly capitalism as the highest and final stage of capitalism.

The term late capitalism began to be used by socialists in continental Europe towards the end of the 1930s and in the 1940s, when many economists believed capitalism was doomed. 
At the end of World War II, many economists, including Joseph Schumpeter and Paul Samuelson, believed the end of capitalism could be near, in that the economic problems might be insurmountable.

The term was used in the 1960s in Germany and Austria, by Western Marxists writing in the tradition of the Frankfurt School and Austromarxism. 
Leo Michielsen and Andre Gorz popularized the term "neo-capitalism" in France and Belgium, with new analyses of the new post-war capitalism. Jacques Derrida preferred neo-capitalism to post- or late-capitalism.
Theodor Adorno preferred "late capitalism" over "industrial society," which was the theme of the 16th Congress of German Sociologists in 1968. 
In 1971, Leo Kofler published a book called Technologische Rationalität im Spätkapitalismus (Technological Rationality in Late Capitalism). 
Claus Offe published his essay "Spätkapitalismus – Versuch einer Begriffsbestimmung" (Late capitalism – an attempt at a conceptual definition) in 1972.  
In 1973, Jürgen Habermas published his Legitimationsprobleme im Spätkapitalismus (Legitimacy problems in late capitalism). 
In 1975, Ernest Mandel published his PhD thesis Late Capitalism in English at New Left Books.
Herbert Marcuse also accepted the term.

Immanuel Wallerstein believed that capitalism was in the process of being replaced by another world system. The American literary critic and cultural theorist Frederic Jameson thought Rudolf Hilferding's term the latest stage of capitalism (jüngster Kapitalismus) perhaps more prudent and less prophetic-sounding but Jameson often used "late capitalism" in his writings.
Hegel's theme of "the end of history" was rekindled by Kojève in his Introduction to the Reading of Hegel. The "end of history" is discussed by Francis Fukuyama in the sense that liberal democracy is the ultimate form of society, which cannot be surpassed by anything that is superior to it, because there does not and cannot exist anything superior.
In modern usage, late capitalism often refers to a new mix of high-tech advances, the concentration of (speculative) financial capital, post-Fordism, and a growing income inequality.

Ernest Mandel
According to the Marxist economist Ernest Mandel, who popularised the term with his 1972 PhD dissertation, late-stage capitalism will be dominated by the machinations—or perhaps better, fluidities—of financial capital; and also by the increasing commodification and industrialisation of ever more inclusive sectors of human life. Mandel believed that "[f]ar from representing a 'post-industrial society', late capitalism [...] constitutes generalized universal industrialization for the first time in history".

Up to the mid-1960s, Mandel preferred to use the term "neo-capitalism", which was most often used by intellectuals in Belgium and France around that time. This term drew attention to new characterististics of capitalism, but at the time ultra-leftist Marxists objected to it, because, according to them, it might suggest that capitalism was no longer capitalism, and it might lead to reformist errors rather than the overthrow of capitalism.

In his work Late Capitalism, Mandel distinguished three periods in the development of the capitalist mode of production.
Freely competitive capitalist production, roughly from 1700 to 1870, through the growth of industrial capital in domestic markets.
The phase of monopoly capitalism, roughly from 1870 to 1940, is characterized by the imperialist competition for international markets, and the exploitation of colonial territories.
The epoch of late capitalism emerging out of the Second World War, which has as its dominant features the multinational corporation, globalized markets and labor, mass consumption, and the space of liquid multinational flows of capital.

In the tradition of the orthodox Marxists, Mandel tried to characterize the nature of the modern epoch as a whole, with reference to the main laws of motion of capitalism specified by Marx. Mandel's aim was to explain the unexpected revival of capitalism after World War II, contrary to leftist prognostications, and the long economic boom which showed the fastest economic growth ever seen in human history. His work has produced a new interest in the theory of long waves in economic development.

Fredric Jameson

Fredric Jameson borrowed Mandel's vision as a basis for his widely cited Postmodernism, or, the Cultural Logic of Late Capitalism. Jameson's postmodernity involves a new mode of cultural production (developments in literature, film, fine art, video, social theory, etc.) which differs markedly from the preceding era of Modernism, particularly in its treatment of subject position, temporality and narrative.

In the modernist era, the dominant ideology was that society could be re-engineered on the basis of scientific and technical knowledge, and on the basis of a popular consensus about the meaning of progress. From the second half of the 20th century, however, modernism was gradually eclipsed by postmodernism, which is skeptical about social engineering and features a lack of consensus about the meaning of progress. In the wake of rapid technological and social change, all the old certainties have broken down. This begins to destabilize every part of life, making almost everything malleable, changeable, transient and impermanent.

Jameson argues that "every position on postmodernism today — whether apologia or stigmatization — is also...necessarily an implicitly or explicitly political stance on the nature of multinational capitalism today". A section of Jameson's analysis has been reproduced on the Marxists Internet Archive. Jameson regards the late capitalist stage as a new and previously unparalleled development with a global reach — whether defined as a multinational or informational capitalism. At the same time,  late capitalism diverges from Marx's prognosis for the final stage of capitalism.

Modern usage of the phrase and further evolution 
According to a 2017 article in The Atlantic, the term "late capitalism" is again in vogue to describe modern business culture, although with a semantic change or an ironic twist. "Late capitalism" has become a catch-all term for various phenomena that express capitalism's distortions of human life and psyche, which is often used in critique and satire. This usage also conveys a sense that contemporary capitalism cannot go on like it does forever, because the problems created by business are getting too large and unmanageable.

The phrase “late stage capitalism” is used commonly as a critique of the allegedly fascistic qualities that emerge in the later stages of capitalism. Capitalism to many may seem to be free of this exploitation if not taken to the extremes of “late capitalism”. A competing viewpoint is that “Capitalism, in its orthodoxy, is a system that relies on authoritative, controlling, and exploitative relationships, most notably between that of capitalists and workers”, and that this is not something that emerges out of a devolving system but rather is present in the framework of the system itself.

In popular culture
A character in Thomas Pynchon's 2013 novel Bleeding Edge states "late capitalism is a pyramid racket on a global scale... getting the suckers to believe it's all gonna go on forever."

Cyberpunk films such as Blade Runner (1982) explore potential consequences of late stage capitalism.

See also

References

Further reading
 Jacques Derrida, Specters of Marx (1994)
Chris Harman : Mandel’s Late Capitalism (July 1978)
 Fredric Jameson, "Culture and Finance Capitalism" Critical Inquiry 24 (1997) pp. 246–65
 
 Paul Mattick : Ernest Mandel’s Late Capitalism (1972)
 Immanuel Wallerstein.  The Essential Wallerstein (New York: The New Press, 2000),  World-Systems Analysis: An Introduction (Durham: Duke University Press, 2004).

External links
 Youtube late capitalism FAQ video by The Atlantic

Capitalism
Economic ideologies
Marxian economics